MPD Psycho, short for , is a manga series written by Eiji Ōtsuka and illustrated by Shou Tajima, published by Kadokawa Shoten from 1997 to 2016. The series follows a police detective suffering from multiple personality disorder.

MPD Psycho was adapted as a live action television miniseries in 2000, directed by Takashi Miike.

Plot
Yôsuke Kobayashi is a detective and is on the case of a serial killer who dismembers his victims. The killer later sends Yôsuke's girlfriend dismembered but kept alive. Yôsuke hunts down the killer and due to the events, loses his sanity and develops Dissociative identity disorder with the two main personalities being Kazuhiko Amamiya, a cool headed detective and Shinji Nishizono, a reckless psychopath. After being placed in prison for murdering the killer, Yôsuke Kobayashi is released and works for an independent detective agency ran by Machi Isono. Later serial killers are appearing with barcodes in their left eyes, which Yôsuke Kobayashi also has. Yôsuke Kobayashi investigations lead him to believe he is not who he thinks he is and that his Kazuhiko and Shinji personalities have existed since childhood.

During the case known as "Lucy Seven", Shinji gains control of Yôsuke Kobayashi and disappears.

Later, it is found out that the Gakuso organization is behind the barcodes. Machi investigates and learns that Kazuhiko Amamiya and Shinji Nishizono are programmed personalities, genetically created (apparently by Gakuso) so that they could merge into a joint personality that is expected to greatly resemble that of Lucy Monostone, a legendary serial killer with a counter-culture personality.

It is revealed that there are multiple Shinji Nishizono personalities and that one exists in Machi's sister, Miwa. Miwa meanwhile runs into Yôsuke Kobayashi on a plane and manages to absorb the Kazuhiko Amamiya personality. At the same time, another host of a Shinji Nishizono personality (a teenager named Tetora Nishizono, who can temporarily transfer his Shinji Nishijono personality template to others) escapes from the Gakuso organization and runs into Miwa.  She later gives the Kazuhiko personality to Tetora, who needs to add that personality to his own in order to remain psychologically stable.  In exchange, Miwa demands that Tetora promise to keep the Kazuhiko personality alive and safe inside him no matter what.

Meanwhile, evidence of internal conflict inside Gakuso and of political use of same by high Japanese authorities mounts, and the police officers investigating the murders find themselves dealing with conflict and suspicion from all sides.

A few years later, Tetora continues his run from the Gakuso organization.  The plot takes surprising turns, removing central characters while introducing new ones, leading to issue #11 which is in its entirety a flashback to events previous to the first issue of the series, bringing a new, more complete understanding of the whole situation.  By #12 we resume the current day storyline and learn of new motivations for at least two characters.  Gakuso's nature and goals are also fleshed out in a surprising way.

Characters

Protagonists

Shinji Nishizono 
 appears to be a police detective working on a serial killing case. While tracking down a serial killer who mutilates his victims by severing their limbs, his girlfriend (Chizuko) is mutilated by the killer, who claims to recognise the detective as a fellow psychopath. 
After tracking down the killer, an arrogant and callous psychopath, emerges and shoots the killer. Amamiya is then arrested and imprisoned for the murder of the serial killer.
Throughout the course of the story, Amamiya Kazuhiko and Nishizono Shinji's personality switch back and forth, with Shinji's personality usually emerging only after a traumatic incident (such as the burning of several bodies) or when the body is in danger. It is usually clear to the reader which personality is in control at any given time as Kazuhiko Amamiya is near-sighted and wears glasses, whereas Shinji Nishizono does not require glasses.
It is later revealed that the original personality of the body belonged to Nishizono Shinji who had killed, along with Murata Kiyoshi, the original Kobayashi Yosuke, the original Amamiya Minako and the original Sakurai Kotone as well as severely burning the original Amamiya Kazuhiko.
After seeing the decapitated bodies of two of the Lucy 7, Nishizono Shinji regains control over his body and reappears after a 6-month time-skip. Coincidentally, he sees Isono Miwa and decides to get on the same flight as her because he thought that "some interesting things would occur" and assists in the hijacking of the plane for his own purposes. While on the plane, Isono Miwa, after a brief struggle, successfully absorbs the personality of Amamiya Kazuhiko from him.
He is shot and killed by a Gakuso Company member while facing off with Nishizono Tetora on the Gakuso experiment ship.

Machi Isono
 is an intelligent criminologist who runs a private consultancy firm. She employs Kazuhiko Amamiya upon his release from prison and invites him to live in the large apartment which serves as home to herself and her sister as well as the headquarters of her business. Her real name is revealed in #13 to be Wakana Isono Monostone.

Miwa Isono
 is the younger sister of Isono Machi. She is initially introduced as a schoolgirl with a forceful personality who occasionally helps Machi and Amamiya in their cases. As the series progresses, she becomes more important as revelations about her role in the conspiracy that runs through the book are revealed. She is later revealed as a new generation bar-coder who carries a crucial alternate personality for the formation of Lucy Monostone. Her last seemingly important role was to transfer the personality of Kazuhiko Amamiya to Nishizono Tetora. Miwa Isono appears episodes five and six of the television series as a comatose girl rescued from a burning hospital who later forms a relationship with Amamiya.

Tetora Nishizono
 is a young teenaged version of Kazuhiko Amamiya, Tetora Nishizono also carries the psychopathic personality of Shinji Nishizono, although the personality of Shinji is far more dominant in Tetora. He receives Kazuhiko's personality from Isono Miwa. Tetora Nishizono does not appear in the TV mini-series.

Antagonists

Gakuso Company

Gakuso is a very secret, very influential and ruthless company with surprisingly high technology in the field of genetics, shrouded in mystery and sometimes confusing in its goals.  Some evidence exists that it suffers from serious internal conflict and seems to have a branch referred separately to as "Onihigata".  Many of the antagonists are involved with Gakuso in some capacity, not always knowing or willing so.  For some reason, one of the main projects of Gakuso seems to be recreating Lucy Monostone by mixing fragments of programmed personalities in a host body. It is revealed in chapter 79 that the reason Gakuso does the barcode experiments is not just to make a perfect killer, but a controllable one who will serve to further their companies aims.

After hints in previous issues, Gakuso's larger political goals are fleshed out in #12.

Zenitsu
A pale-haired man who seems frequently involved with many serial killers, including Toguchi Kikuo, Nishizono Shinji (original) and Umemiya Akio. He refers to an unnamed woman as his "mama". He shows abnormal regenerative abilities (being able to completely regenerate his forearm) and wears earphone-like machines which can release endorphins to dull his sense of pain. He often uses guns with abnormally powerful firepower. As a punishment for "losing Tetora" as well as several other blunders, he was disfigured.

Kazuhiko Amamiya
The real  first appears in chapter 10 in a flashback of "20 years ago" where he is apparently killed and burnt by Nishizono Shinji and Murata Kiyoshi. He reappears as an adult near Teu at the end of chapter 28 with a distinctive burn on the left side of his face and a later flashback reveals that he was rescued by an individual that appears to be Teu. He dies after being tricked by Nishizono Tetora into absorbing a destructive program.

Murata Kiyoshi 
Somewhat shy and mentally retarded, the real Murata Kiyoshi first appears in chapter 10 in a flashback of "20 years ago" where he assists  the real Nishizono Shinji in disposing of the corpses of the other children and the nurse at Amamiya clinic. He refers to Shinji as "Shin-chan" and claims that he was the only one who did not bully him. He is burnt to death after a fire spreads to the oil that he is drenched with.

Lucy Monostone
, a deceased former American pop star and terrorist, is thought by the mysterious corporation at the heart of the conspiracy to be the perfect killer. While genetic engineering can recreate Monostone's body, the challenge appears to be recreating his soul in order for the ultimate murderer to be reborn. It seems that this can only be achieved by combining a number of personalities, representing the different parts of Monostone, into a single vessel.

Other characters

A bumbling police detective and friend of Kazuhiko and Machi. Short tempered and easily confused, Sasayama is nevertheless a "straight arrow" and reliably on the side of the good guys. After Kazuhiko Amamiya is taken over by Nishzono Shinji, Sasayama becomes a much more central character to the story.

Inuhiko
A police officer, introduced in Chapter 8 (Vol. 8). Plays a major role in the "Wings" case. Later on is suspected in the death of a Chinese doctor.

Uran Tenma
A police detective that partners with Sasayama, beginning in Chapter 8 (Vol. 8). Often made fun of by Sasayama for her short stature.

Akira Kitou
A high-ranked police officer introduced in Chapter 3 (Vol. 3).  Despite his duties to Onihigata, he seems sincerely interested in unraveling the mysteries behind the murders and promoting justice and safety. He is the Spare of Tatsuo Onihigata, making the sole purpose of his existence to be an organ donor should original need one. He dies after a failed attempt to kill Onihigata, and ultimately donates his liver (unwillingly) to his would-be victim.

Tatsuo Onihigata
Minister of Justice of Japan.  Heavily involved in the plot and a highly skilled manipulator.

Shoku Koike
A later employee of Machi Isono.  He is the nephew of Lucy Monostone, and the supposed "perfect vessel" for the personalities that make up the soul of his uncle. He is killed by Nishizono Tetora while trying to retrieve the personality of Kazuhiko Amamiya.

Kikuo Toguchi
A journalistic photographer that often works along Sasayama at the time of the beginning of the story.  He plays an important role in revealing the existence of the Shinji Nishizono personality to Machi Isono. His most recognizable feature is his eyepatch that often contain different pictures such as an eyeball, a smiley face, a barcode, (etc.) on its surface. After he learns that he has cataracts in his remaining eye, he reverts into the killer that all of the bar-code samples ultimately become.

Zenitsu
A field operative of Gakuso. He is thought to be immortal by many characters as he seems to survive every attack made on him, including being run over by a car, and falling with a helicopter which explodes crashes into a tower when the pilot is shot.

Candyman
Gakuso staff. Enjoys sweets and candy to a pitiful extent. Talks through a mechanical device attached to his neck. He was in charge of keeping Nishizono Tetora under control by supplying him with medicines which must be taken in sequential order based on the numbers printed on the pills. He calls these pills "candies". These medications stabilize Tetora's personalities and allow him to survive. However, when Sasayama supplies Tetora with the "zero candy", he is no longer reliant on the Candyman and kills him.

Teu Mimegumi
Gakuso staff. Often changes her name. Head of the Gakuso research boat.  She is apparently involved with a faction of Gakuso that is in conflict with Onihigata.

Media

Manga

Main storyline 
MPD Psycho was initially published in Shōnen Ace, moving to Comic Charge in 2007 and remaining there until the magazine was cancelled in 2009. Then it moved again, this time to the new publication Young Ace, which debuted in the later half of 2009. The "Last Chapter" of MPD Psycho was published on February 4, 2016, and it was followed by "The End+ONE" on March 4. Dark Horse Comics published the English translation, but put the series on indefinite hiatus after volume 9 was released. Dark Horse announced in September 2010 it would resume MPD Psycho with the stabilization of the American manga market. The tenth volume was published in December 2011, followed by another hiatus that ended with the publication of the eleventh volume on July 23, 2014. The digital volumes of MPD Psycho were released on BookWalker on November 6, 2015.

Supplemental

Self-parody 
Drawn by Hirarin

Live-action series

The plot is similar to the beginning of the manga series but does not relate to the incidents of Lucy Monostone and the Gakuso Company. Yosuke Kobayashi, a detective assigned to a homicide unit, saw his wife killed by a serial killer, Shinji Nishizono. From the shock of the incident, he suffers from multiple personality disorder and becomes Kazuhiko Amamiya. Soon after he manages to hunt down and kill his wife's murderer. Now a series of murders have started and the suspect claimed to be Shinji Nishizono.

References

External links 
Kadokawa Shoten MPD Psycho website 
 
 

Dark Horse Comics titles
Japanese television dramas based on manga
Kadokawa Dwango franchises
Kadokawa Shoten manga
Seinen manga
Shōnen manga